The Mercedes W13, officially Mercedes-AMG F1 W13 E Performance, is a Formula One racing car designed and constructed by the Mercedes-AMG Petronas Formula One Team to compete in the 2022 Formula One World Championship. The car was driven by Lewis Hamilton and George Russell. The chassis was Mercedes's first car built for the new ground effect technical regulations introduced in 2022. The W13 saw the return of the traditional silver livery, after the W11 and W12 were painted black in support of the Black Lives Matter movement.

Launch and pre-season testing
The Mercedes AMG F1 W13, with the exception of the car's drivetrain was an all new car designed to conform to the new FIA regulations in effect as of 2022. The car was officially unveiled at the Silverstone Circuit with Hamilton and Russell completing an inaugural shakedown on 18 February 2022. The car took part the pre-season testing 1 at Circuit de Barcelona-Catalunya on 23 February – 25 February. The car then took part in the second pre-season test at the Bahrain International Circuit on 10 March – 12 March. Both tests showed that the car appeared to be suffering handling and balance problems partly due to excessive porpoising, with Hamilton writing off the team's chances of winning the first race of the season. The W13 underwent a significant change with an almost sidepod-less design. This design was used throughout the Bahrain test and became the primary design for the team. Red Bull team principal, Christian Horner, was initially quoted as saying that the design was not "to the spirit of the regulations." A Red Bull spokesperson later said this was incorrect, stating that "no official comment" had been made by the team. From a new turbocharger and fuel management system, Mercedes managed to increase 20 more horsepower from the new M13 E Performance power unit, resulting in a total maximum power output of 800 kW (1,070 hp). The car finished first and second in the third session of testing with Lewis Hamilton setting the fastest time of a 1.19.138. This was the fastest time of all three testing sessions.

Season summary
The W13 was set to run in a special "Red Pig" livery at the Belgian Grand Prix to celebrate 55 years of Mercedes-AMG, the livery itself was a half-and-half paint job, inspired by the 1971 24 hours of Spa class winning Mercedes-AMG "Rote Sau" 300 SEL 6.8 race car. It was to be the first time for Mercedes to compete in a race with a special livery since the 2019 German Grand Prix. But later, Mercedes decided to not to use the special livery, due to weight issues and lack of time as three back-to-back races were scheduled for the upcoming three weeks. While the red to silver livery did not materialise, some elements of the livery, including the AMG logos and driver numbers, were present. The W13 proved to be uncompetitive in the early part of the season until Mercedes brought significant upgrades to the car in Spain. Hamilton and Russell were able to finish on the podium when either one of Ferrari's drivers hit trouble, with Russell finishing in the top 5 until Silverstone where he retired on lap 1. Despite being a less competitive car compared to its predecessors, it was reliable until Hamilton retired in the final race of the season in Abu Dhabi with a hydraulics problem on lap 55. Russell managed to score his first pole position at the Hungarian Grand Prix and his first win at the São Paulo Grand Prix, which was the team's first win since the 2021 Saudi Arabian Grand Prix and their first 1–2 finish since the 2020 Emilia Romagna Grand Prix. This is the first time since 2012 the team had won only one race. With Russell's victory in Interlagos, Mercedes‘ eleven-season streak of winning at least one race continues and it is currently the longest active streak in Formula One as well as the third longest in the sport’s history.

The W13 is regarded as one of the worst Mercedes-AMG developed cars to date rivalling the race record of pre turbo-hybrid era Mercedes cars. Toto Wolff, Mercedes-AMG F1 Team Principal, claims that he intends to "put these cars in the reception at Brackley and in Brixworth to remind us every single day how difficult it can be".

Complete Formula One results
(key)

References

External links
 Official website 

F1 W13
2022 Formula One season cars